Steven Maxwell Porcaro (born September 2, 1957) is an American keyboardist, songwriter, singer, and film composer, known as one of the founding members of the rock band Toto and the last surviving Porcaro brother (after the deaths of Jeff in 1992 and Mike in 2015); as the songwriter of "Human Nature" by Michael Jackson and songs by Toto; and as the composer of the TV series Justified. He has won three Grammys, including Record of the Year for "Rosanna" and Album of the Year for Toto IV, and three nominations.

Porcaro has appeared as a session musician on recordings by Yes (on Union and Open Your Eyes) and Jefferson Airplane (on their self-titled 1989 reunion album). He was also a member of Chris Squire's short-lived band, The Chris Squire Experiment, in 1992.

Early life 
Porcaro is a native of Connecticut. Just like his brothers Jeff and Mike, Steve Porcaro started out as a drummer under the tutelage of his father Joe Porcaro, before taking up piano. In 1967, his father bought him an organ made by Rheem, a company that specializes in heating and air conditioning. Soon after, he brought his father down to a Guitar Center to trade in the keyboard for a Farfisa with a Leslie 147 and preamp, which Porcaro called his "first real rig".

Career 
Porcaro's touring career began playing with Gary Wright during his tour in 1977, supporting the latter's The Dream Weaver album. Porcaro and the other original members of Toto then played with Boz Scaggs before forming Toto.

Porcaro wrote or co-wrote at least one song on each of Toto's first six albums, with the exception of Isolation. His two older brothers Mike and Jeff were Toto's bassist and drummer as well as session musicians while his father Joe was a prolific session percussionist.

Unlike most of his Toto bandmates, he generally did not contribute lead or even backing vocals; he considered himself a weak singer, and sang lead on two of his earlier compositions only because he felt that the vocal styles of his bandmates, with the exception of Joseph Williams, were not appropriate for his songs. The song "Rosanna" was supposedly inspired by Porcaro's girlfriend at the time, Rosanna Arquette but this has since been denied by the song's writer, David Paich, and Arquette herself.

In an interview with Ben Mankiewicz in 2022 both Paich and Arquette admitted on camera that yes, she was the inspiration.

He left Toto in 1987 after the Fahrenheit album in order to pursue a more full-time songwriting and composing career. However, Porcaro continued working with Toto in various supporting capacities, assisting with keyboards, drum looping, synthesizers and arranging/composing.

Porcaro composed the music for the song "Human Nature" and produced the synthesizer for "The Girl Is Mine" from Michael Jackson's album Thriller, as well as playing synthesizer and keyboard on "Stranger in Moscow" from Jackson's HIStory album.

Steve Porcaro composes music for film and television, including the FX television show Justified, among others.

Porcaro returned to play with Toto at live performances since 2010, when they decided to reform the band and tour in Europe to support Mike Porcaro. They scheduled further concerts in Europe.

Porcaro performed on the band's 2015 studio album Toto XIV, co-writing and singing lead on "The Little Things" and writing/singing lead on the Japan-only bonus cut, "Bend". When the band dissolved in 2019 and regrouped in 2020, Porcaro did not return.

Someday/Somehow 
Steve released his first ever solo album on June 10, 2016. Someday/Somehow was co-written/produced by Michael Sherwood, former member of the band Lodgic. The album contains 13 songs, one of which reunites Steve with his late brothers Mike and Jeff Porcaro, from recordings made prior to their passing.

Contributions are from Michael McDonald, Jamie Kimmett, Michael Sherwood, Mabvuto Carpenter, Marc Bonilla, Steve Lukather, Lenny Castro, Jimmy Haun, Shannon Forrest, Jeff Porcaro and Mike Porcaro.

Equipment 
Steve Porcaro played a huge variety of synthesizers on Toto albums. While David Paich handled piano duties, it was usually Steve's job to complement the music with creative synth sounds. He was known to use Yamaha GS1, Yamaha DX1, Yamaha DX7, Yamaha CS-80, Roland Jupiter-8, Minimoog, Oberheim Xpander, Polyfusion Modular, Dynacord Add-one and Sequential Circuits Prophet-5 synthesizers among others. The synth solo in the Toto song "Rosanna" is a noted example of his approach.

In later years he gravitated towards working with software synthesizers. Onstage he is using two Yamaha keyboards (a Montage 8 and a Yamaha Motif XF7) to drive his Apple MainStage-based virtual synth rig, which draws samples from Logic's ES2 plug-in and Spitfire Audio libraries among others.

Personal life 
He collaborated with his daughter Heather Porcaro on her debut album, The Heartstring Symphony, released in 2009. Heather was featured in Paper magazine's "Most Beautiful People" issue in 2002.

References

External links 

 Official homepage on Toto website
 
  TOTO-Hydrasolation — Le site Web des Fans de TOTO
 Heather Porcaro official site – Steve Porcaro keyboards
 Steve Porcaro NAMM Oral History Program Interview (2006)

1957 births
20th-century American male musicians
21st-century American keyboardists
21st-century American male musicians
20th-century American keyboardists
Living people
American rock keyboardists
American film score composers
Songwriters from Connecticut
Musicians from Hartford, Connecticut
People from South Windsor, Connecticut
American session musicians
American people of Italian descent
Toto (band) members
American pop keyboardists
The Chris Squire Experiment members
Conspiracy (band) members